para-Methoxyfentanyl or ''p''-methoxyfentanyl or 4-methoxyfentanyl is a potent short-acting synthetic opioid analgesic drug.  It is an analog of fentanyl, with similar effects but slightly lower potency.

See also
 3-Methylbutyrfentanyl
 4-Fluorobutyrfentanyl
 4-Fluorofentanyl
 α-Methylfentanyl
 Acetylfentanyl
 Benzylfentanyl
 Furanylfentanyl
 Homofentanyl
 List of fentanyl analogues

References

Further reading 

 
 
 
 
 

General anesthetics
Synthetic opioids
Piperidines
Anilides
Mu-opioid receptor agonists
Methoxy compounds